The NWA Florida X Division Championship was a title defended in the Florida territory of the National Wrestling Alliance.

Title history

References

External links
Wrestling Information Archive
Wrestling-Titles.com

National Wrestling Alliance championships
X Division championships
Professional wrestling in Florida
National Wrestling Alliance state wrestling championships